Rebecca Sealy Hospital was an eight-story hospital, and one of five hospitals on the campus of the University of Texas Medical Branch (UTMB) in Galveston, Texas, United States.  It was founded in 1866 as St. Mary's Hospital, a private, Catholic, general hospital, but was purchased in 1996 by the Sealy & Smith Foundation.  The foundation renamed it and donated it to the university for use as a psychiatric, outpatient surgery, and research hospital.

Hurricane Ike
In 2008, severe flooding from Hurricane Ike damaged all UTMB facilities, including Rebecca Sealy Hospital.  The inpatient psychiatric unit closed and the building was renovated into offices and simulation labs.

See also
John Sealy Hospital
List of Texas Medical Center institutions
List of hospitals in Texas

References

Hospital buildings completed in 1866
Healthcare in Galveston, Texas
Hospitals established in 1996
University of Texas Medical Branch
Institutions in the Texas Medical Center
Teaching hospitals in Texas
1866 establishments in Texas